Psilops is a genus of lizards in the family Gymnophthalmidae. They are endemic to Brazil.

Species
Psilops mucugensis  
Psilops paeminosus  
Psilops seductus

References 

 
Lizard genera
Taxa named by Miguel Trefaut Rodrigues
Taxa named by Renato Recoder
Taxa named by Mauro Teixeira Jr.
Taxa named by Juliana Gusson Roscito
Taxa named by Augustín Camacho Guerrero
Taxa named by Pedro M. Sales-Nunes
Taxa named by Marco A. de Freitas
Taxa named by Daniel Fernandes da Silva
Taxa named by Adriana Bocchiglieri
Taxa named by Francisco Dal Vechio
Taxa named by Felipe Sá Fortes Leite
Taxa named by Cristiano Nogueira
Taxa named by Roberta Damasceno
Taxa named by Kátia Cristina Machado Pellegrino
Taxa named by Antônio Jorge Suzart Argôlo
Taxa named by Renata Cecília Amaro